Waterman Wash is a tributary stream or arroyo of the Gila River, in Maricopa County, Arizona, United States.

References

Rivers of Maricopa County, Arizona
Washes of Arizona